69th is a station on the Chicago Transit Authority's 'L' system, serving the Red Line. The station is located in the median of the Dan Ryan Expressway, within the Greater Grand Crossing neighborhood. This station connects with the second most bus routes (first is 95th/Dan Ryan) on the Dan Ryan Branch, and is one of the terminals for the N5 South Shore Night Bus (the other is 95th/Dan Ryan). This makes it an important connection for buses, especially Night Owl connections.

69th was closed from May to October 2013 as part of the Red Line South Reconstruction project.

History 
The Normal Park Branch, built by the South Side Elevated Railroad, ran as a short shuttle service from Harvard station  to Parnell and 69th Street, a half mile west from the Dan Ryan. This service had very low ridership and the line was demolished by 1954.

69th was built in a modern, International style featuring large amounts of steel and glass and very little amenities, to complement the design of the brand new stainless-steel 2200 series trains that ran on the brand-new line.

Bus connections 
CTA
  N5 South Shore Night Bus (Owl Service) 
  29 State 
  30 South Chicago (Monday–Saturday only) 
  67 67th/69th/71st 
  71 71st/South Shore 
   169 69th/UPS Express (Weekday UPS shifts only)

References

External links 

 Train schedule (PDF) at CTA official site
 69th/Dan Ryan Station Page at Chicago-L.org
 69th/Dan Ryan Station Page CTA official site
 69th Street entrance from Google Maps Street View

CTA Red Line stations
Railway stations in the United States opened in 1969